Schrader may refer to:
 Schrader, family name
 Schrader, West Virginia
 Schrader Creek, Pennsylvania, United States
 Schrader Range, a mountain range in Papua New Guinea
 Pic Schrader, a mountain in the Pyrenees
 Hank Schrader, fictional character in the American television drama series Breaking Bad, portrayed by Dean Norris
 Schrader valve, a valve for controlling air in automobile and bicycle tires